Foutaises (English title: Things I Like, Things I Hate) is a 1989 French short film directed by Jean-Pierre Jeunet.

Plot 
Dominique Pinon talks to the camera describing his likes and dislikes, ranging from the simple such as "I hate men with a beard but no moustache" to the more touching, "I like to think that after death can't be worse than before birth." Each of his examples is accompanied by a visual demonstration.

The actress Marie-Laure Dougnac (Pinon's collaborator in Delicatessen), also makes a cameo appearance. 
Jean-Pierre Jeunet reused this technique in his 2001 film Amélie when introducing the characters.

Cast 
 Dominique Pinon: The Man
 Chick Ortega
 Marie-Laure Dougnac
 Diane Bertrand
 Fabienne Chaudat

External links

1990 films
1990 comedy films
French black-and-white films
Films directed by Jean-Pierre Jeunet
1990s French-language films
French comedy short films
1990s French films